{{Speciesbox
| image =
| status = LC
| status_system = IUCN3.1
| status_ref = 
| genus = Ctenophorus
| species = isolepis
| subdivision_ranks = Subspecies
| subdivision = :C. i. isolepis
C. i. citrinus
C. i. gularis
| authority = (Fischer, 1881)
| synonyms = * Amphibolurus isolepis 
 Grammatophra isolepis 
 Phthanodon isolepis 
| synonyms_ref = 
| range_map = Ctenophorus_isolepis_distribution.png
| range_map_caption = Distribution of Ctenophorus isolepis
}}Ctenophorus isolepis, commonly known as the central military dragon, military dragon or military sand dragon, is a species of agamid lizard occurring in the arid parts of central and western Australia.Wilson, S., Swan, G. (2013) A Complete Guide to Reptiles of Australia, New Holland Publishers, Sydney, New South Wales, 

Description
Adult central military dragons range in colour from yellowish to reddish-brown, with blotches and flecks ranging in colour from pale to dark.

Ecology, behaviour and distribution
The central military dragon lives in arid parts of central and western Australia areas of sand-ridge deserts and loamy flats usually in areas with spinifex ground cover which they will hide in if alarmed. They live entirely above-ground, usually avoiding elevated and exposed areas, instead preferring to forage in areas of bare ground between low vegetation. They occur in outback Western Australia, across into the southern half of the Northern Territory and north-western South Australia, as well as into south-western Queensland.C. rubens'' was previously considered to be a subspecies.

References

Reptiles described in 1881
Endemic fauna of Australia
Agamid lizards of Australia
isolepis
Taxa named by Johann Gustav Fischer